Paul F. Webster is a British journalist who has been the editor of The Observer since 2018. He was previously the deputy editor of The Observer for 20 years under Will Hutton, Roger Alton, and John Mulholland, and before that, the foreign and home editor of The Guardian.

Webster is the author of a 1993 biography of the French writer and aviator Antoine de Saint-Exupéry.

The Observer 
Webster became editor of The Observer as a result of his promotion by Guardian Media Group editor-in-chief Katharine Viner, who said he would be a "superb" editor. Webster said: "I am delighted and honoured to be appointed editor, especially at such an exciting time in the paper’s development as it relaunches in its new tabloid format." He succeeded John Mulholland, who took up a role as editor of Guardian US in the Manhattan-based American online presence of the British print newspaper in April 2018.

References

External links 
 

21st-century British journalists
British newspaper editors
Date of birth missing (living people)
Year of birth missing (living people)
Living people
The Guardian people
The Observer people